Cool Sax from Hollywood to Broadway is an album by American jazz saxophonist Eddie Harris recorded in 1964 and released on the Columbia label.

Reception
The Allmusic review states "This hard-to-find LP has some good music but is not essential".

Track listing
All compositions by Eddie Harris except as indicated
 "People" (Bob Merrill, Jule Styne) – 3:00 
 "From Russia With Love" (Lionel Bart) – 1:58 
 "Topkapi" (Manos Hadjidakis) – 4:56 
 "Days of Wine and Roses" (Henry Mancini, Johnny Mercer) – 5:59 
 "Groovy Movies" – 3:26 
 "Who Can I Turn To (When Nobody Needs Me)" (Leslie Bricusse, Anthony Newley) – 3:07 
 "Theme from "Malamondo"" (Ennio Morricone) – 3:27 
 "Sarah's Theme" – 7:14 
 "On Green Dolphin Street" (Bronisław Kaper, Ned Washington) – 2:36 
 "Night Must Fall" – 3:23 
 "I've Grown Accustomed to Her Face" (Alan Jay Lerner, Frederick Loewe) – 3:42 
 "Little Lo Lo" – 2:57

Personnel
Eddie Harris – tenor saxophone
Cedar Walton – piano (1, 3-12)
Kenny Burrell – guitar (2, 7) 
Bob Cranshaw – bass (1, 3-12)
Billy Brooks – drums (1, 3-12)

References 

Eddie Harris albums
1964 albums
Columbia Records albums
Albums produced by Tom Wilson (record producer)